Pyrausta melanocera is a moth in the family Crambidae. It was described by George Hampson in 1913. It is found in Nigeria.

References

Endemic fauna of Nigeria
Moths described in 1913
melanocera
Moths of Africa